Katsukiyo (written:  or ) is a masculine Japanese given name. Notable people with the name include:

, Japanese daimyō
, Japanese Go player

Japanese masculine given names